Animation historian Jerry Beck had posted on Cartoon Research lists of animated shorts from various studios considered for nomination of the Academy Award for Best Animated Short Film, beginning with 1948 and ending for the time being with 1986.

According to Jerry, each film submitted to the Academy fall into one or more of these categories: “Craft”, “Heart” or “Humor”.

Missing gaps on that site are 1949, 1950, 1976, 1981, 1982 and 1985.

Note: ± means the film was nominated for the award.

Notable films

1937

1940

1942

1943

1946

1947

1948

1950s

1960s

1970s

1980s

2005

2009-present

See also
Submissions for Best Animated Feature Academy Award

References

External links
Best Animated Short Blog
Cartoon Research
 Oscar shortlist
Submissions on Animation Magazine
Qualifications and Rules on Animation World Network

History of animation
Academy Awards lists